Winkana is a village in the Kyain Seikgyi Township of the Kayin State, Myanmar.

References

External links
"Winkana Map  Satellite Images of Winkana" Maplandia World Gazetteer

Populated places in Kayin State
Kyain Seikgyi Township